Robert T. Crowley may refer to:

Robert Crowley (CIA) (1924–2000), Assistant Deputy Director of Clandestine Operations of the CIA
R. T. Crowley (born 1948), pioneer in electronic commerce